Manda may refer to:

Places
 Kafr Manda, Arab town in the Lower Galilee
 Manda Upazila, an upazila in the Division of Rajshahi, Bangladesh
 Manda, Kale, a village in Burma
 Manda, Guinea, a town in the Labé Region
 Manda, Jammu, India, a village
 Manda (zamindari), an erstwhile feudal estate in India, near Allahabad
 Manda (Tanzanian ward), an administrative ward in Dodoma Region, Tanzania
 Manda, Missouri, a ghost town in the United States
 Manda National Park, Chad
 Manda Island, Lamu Archipelago, Kenya

People
 Manda people, an ethnic and linguistic group in southern Tanzania
 Manda (name), a list of people with the given name or surname

Fictional characters
 Manda Best, in the soap opera EastEnders
 Manda (kaiju), a dragon-based kaiju that appears in Japanese monster films
 Manda, a giant snake in the Naruto manga series

Other uses
 Manda (beetle), a genus of insects in the family Staphylinidae
 Beth manda, a place of worship for followers of Mandaeism
 Manda (Mandaeism), the concept of gnosis or spiritual knowledge in Mandaeism
 Manda language (disambiguation), multiple languages
 Manda (goddess), a Hindu deity

See also

 
 
 Mandar (disambiguation)
 Ibn Manda (died 1004/5), Isfahani Sunni Hadith scholar
 Kafr Manda, an Israeli-Arab town in the Lower Galilee, near Nazareth
 Manda Formation, a geologic formation in Tanzania
 Amanda (disambiguation)
 Mandau (disambiguation)
 Mande (disambiguation)

Language and nationality disambiguation pages